Joseph Thomas Sheridan Le Fanu (28 August 1814 – 7 February 1873) was an Irish writer of Gothic tales, mystery novels, and horror fiction. He was a leading ghost story writer of his time, central to the development of the genre in the Victorian era. M. R. James described Le Fanu as "absolutely in the first rank as a writer of ghost stories".  Three of his best-known works are the locked-room mystery Uncle Silas, the lesbian vampire novella Carmilla, and the historical novel The House by the Churchyard.

Early life
Sheridan Le Fanu was born at 45 Lower Dominick Street, Dublin, into a literary family of Huguenot, Irish and English descent. He had an elder sister, Catherine Frances, and a younger brother, William Richard. His parents were Thomas Philip Le Fanu and Emma Lucretia Dobbin. 
Both his grandmother Alicia Sheridan Le Fanu and his great-uncle Richard Brinsley Sheridan were playwrights (his niece Rhoda Broughton would become a successful novelist), and his mother was also a writer, producing a biography of Charles Orpen. Within a year of his birth, his family moved to the Royal Hibernian Military School in the Phoenix Park, where his father, a Church of Ireland clergyman, was appointed to the chaplaincy of the establishment. The Phoenix Park and the adjacent village and parish church of Chapelizod would appear in Le Fanu's later stories.

In 1826 the family moved to Abington, County Limerick, where Le Fanu's father Thomas took up his second rectorship in Ireland. Although he had a tutor, who, according to his brother William, taught them nothing and was finally dismissed in disgrace, Le Fanu used his father's library to educate himself. By the age of fifteen, Joseph was writing poetry which he shared with his mother and siblings but never with his father. His father was a stern Protestant churchman and raised his family in an almost Calvinist tradition.

In 1832 the disorders of the Tithe War (1831–36) affected the region. There were about six thousand Catholics in the parish of Abington and only a few dozen members of the Church of Ireland. (In bad weather the Dean cancelled Sunday services because so few parishioners would attend.) However, the government compelled all farmers, including Catholics, to pay tithes for the upkeep of the Protestant church. The following year the family moved back temporarily to Dublin, to Williamstown Avenue in a southern suburb, where Thomas was to work on a Government commission.

Later life 
Although Thomas Le Fanu tried to live as though he were well-off, the family was in constant financial difficulty. Thomas took the rectorships in the south of Ireland for the money, as they provided a decent living through tithes. However, from 1830, as the result of agitation against the tithes, this income began to fall, and it ceased entirely two years later. In 1838 the government instituted a scheme of paying rectors a fixed sum, but in the interim, the Dean had little besides rent on some small properties he had inherited. In 1833 Thomas had to borrow £100 from his cousin Captain Dobbins (who himself ended up in the debtors' prison a few years later) to visit his dying sister in Bath, who was also deeply in debt over her medical bills. At his death, Thomas had almost nothing to leave to his sons, and the family had to sell his library to pay off some of his debts. His widow went to stay with the younger son, William.

Sheridan Le Fanu studied law at Trinity College Dublin, where he was elected Auditor of the College Historical Society. Under a system peculiar to Ireland he did not have to live in Dublin to attend lectures, but could study at home and take examinations at the university when necessary. He was called to the bar in 1839, but he never practised and soon abandoned law for journalism. In 1838 he began contributing stories to the Dublin University Magazine, including his first ghost story, entitled "The Ghost and the Bone-Setter" (1838). He became the owner of several newspapers from 1840, including the Dublin Evening Mail and the Warder.

On 18 December 1844, Le Fanu married Susanna Bennett, the daughter of a leading Dublin barrister, George Bennett, and granddaughter of John Bennett, a justice of the Court of King's Bench. Future Home Rule League MP Isaac Butt was a witness. The couple then travelled to his parents' home in Abington for Christmas. They took a house in Warrington Place near the Grand Canal in Dublin. Their first child, Eleanor, was born in 1845, followed by Emma in 1846, Thomas in 1847 and George in 1854.

In 1847 Le Fanu supported John Mitchel and Thomas Francis Meagher in their campaign against the indifference of the government to the Irish Famine. Others involved in the campaign included Samuel Ferguson and Isaac Butt. Butt wrote a forty-page analysis of the national disaster for the Dublin University Magazine in 1847. His support cost him the nomination as Tory MP for County Carlow in 1852.

In 1856 the family moved from Warrington Place to the house of Susanna's parents at 18 Merrion Square (later number 70, the office of the Irish Arts Council). Her parents retired to live in England. Le Fanu never owned the house, but rented it from his brother-in-law for £22 per annum (which he still failed to pay in full).

His personal life also became difficult at this time, as his wife suffered from increasing neurotic symptoms. She had a crisis of faith and attended religious services at the nearby St. Stephen's Church.  She also discussed religion with William, Le Fanu's younger brother, as Le Fanu had apparently stopped attending services. She suffered from anxiety after the deaths of several close relatives, including her father two years before, which may have led to marital problems.

In April 1858 she suffered a "hysterical attack" and died the following day in unclear circumstances. She was buried in the Bennett family vault in Mount Jerome Cemetery beside her father and brothers. The anguish of Le Fanu's diaries suggests that he felt guilt as well as loss. From then on he did not write any fiction until the death of his mother in 1861. He turned to his cousin Lady Gifford for advice and encouragement, and she remained a close correspondent until her death at the end of the decade.

In 1861 he became the editor and proprietor of the Dublin University Magazine, and he began to take advantage of double publication, first serialising in the Dublin University Magazine, then revising for the English market. He published both The House by the Churchyard and Wylder's Hand in this way. After lukewarm reviews of the former novel, set in the Phoenix Park area of Dublin, Le Fanu signed a contract with Richard Bentley, his London publisher, which specified that future novels be stories "of an English subject and of modern times", a step Bentley thought necessary for Le Fanu to satisfy the English audience. Le Fanu succeeded in this aim in 1864, with the publication of Uncle Silas, which he set in Derbyshire. In his last short stories, however, Le Fanu returned to Irish folklore as an inspiration and encouraged his friend Patrick Kennedy to contribute folklore to the D.U.M.

Le Fanu died of a heart attack in his native Dublin on 7 February 1873, at the age of 58. According to Russell Kirk, in his essay "A Cautionary Note on the Ghostly Tale" in The Surly Sullen Bell, Le Fanu "is believed to have literally died of fright"; but Kirk does not give the circumstances. Today there is a road and a park in Ballyfermot, near his childhood home in southwest Dublin, named after him.

Work

Le Fanu worked in many genres but remains best known for his horror fiction. He was a meticulous craftsman and frequently reworked plots and ideas from his earlier writing in subsequent pieces. Many of his novels, for example, are expansions and refinements of earlier short stories. He specialised in tone and effect rather than "shock horror" and liked to leave important details unexplained and mysterious. He avoided overt supernatural effects: in most of his major works, the supernatural is strongly implied but a "natural" explanation is also possible. The demonic monkey in "Green Tea" could be a delusion of the story's protagonist, who is the only person to see it; in "The Familiar", Captain Barton's death seems to be supernatural but is not actually witnessed, and the ghostly owl may be a real bird. This technique influenced later horror artists, both in print and on film (see, for example, the film producer Val Lewton's principle of "indirect horror"). Though other writers have since chosen less subtle techniques, Le Fanu's finest tales, such as the vampire novella Carmilla and the short story "Schalken the Painter", remain some of the most powerful in the genre. He had an enormous influence on one of the 20th century's most important ghost story writers, M. R. James, and although his work fell out of favour in the early part of the 20th century, towards the end of the century interest in his work increased and remains comparatively strong.

The Purcell Papers
His earliest twelve short stories, written between 1838 and 1840, purport to be the literary remains of an 18th-century Catholic priest called Father Purcell. They were published in the Dublin University Magazine and were later collected as The Purcell Papers (1880). They are mostly set in Ireland and include some classic stories of gothic horror, with gloomy castles, supernatural visitations from beyond the grave, madness, and suicide. Also apparent are nostalgia and sadness for the dispossessed Catholic aristocracy of Ireland, whose ruined castles stand as a mute witness to this history. Some of the stories still often appear in anthologies:
 "The Ghost and the Bonesetter" (1838), his first-published, jocular story.
 "The Fortunes of Sir Robert Ardagh" (1838), an enigmatic story which partially involves a Faustian pact and is set in the gothic ambiance of a castle in rural Ireland.
 "The Last Heir of Castle Connor" (1838), a non-supernatural tale, exploring the decline and expropriation of the ancient Catholic gentry of Ireland under the Protestant Ascendancy.
 "The Drunkard's Dream" (1838), a haunting vision of Hell.
 "Passage in the Secret History of an Irish Countess" (1838), an early version of his later novel Uncle Silas.
 "Strange Event in the Life of Schalken  the Painter" (1839), a disturbing version of the demon lover motif. This tale was inspired by the atmospheric candlelit scenes of the 17th-century Dutch painter Godfried Schalcken, who is the model for the story's protagonist. M. R. James stated that "Schalken' conforms more strictly to my own ideals. It is indeed one of the best of Le Fanu's good things." It was adapted and broadcast for television as Schalcken the Painter by the BBC for Christmas 1979, starring Jeremy Clyde and John Justin.
 "A Chapter in the History of a Tyrone Family" (1839), which may have influenced Charlotte Brontë's Jane Eyre. This story was later reworked and expanded by Le Fanu as The Wyvern Mystery (1869).

Revised versions of "Irish Countess" and "Schalken" were reprinted in Le Fanu's first collection of short stories, the very rare Ghost Stories and Tales of Mystery (1851).

Spalatro
An anonymous novella Spalatro: From the Notes of Fra Giacomo, published in the Dublin University Magazine in 1843, was added to the Le Fanu canon as late as 1980, being recognised as Le Fanu's work by W. J. McCormack in his biography of that year. Spalatro has a typically Gothic Italian setting, featuring a bandit as the hero, as in Ann Radcliffe (whose 1797 novel The Italian includes a repentant minor villain of the same name). More disturbing, however, is the hero Spalatro's necrophiliac passion for an undead blood-drinking beauty, who seems to be a predecessor of Le Fanu's later female vampire Carmilla. Like Carmilla, this undead femme fatale is not portrayed in an entirely negative way and attempts, but fails, to save the hero Spalatro from the eternal damnation that seems to be his destiny.

Le Fanu wrote this story after the death of his elder sister Catherine in March 1841. She had been ailing for about ten years, but her death came as a great shock to him.

Historical fiction
Le Fanu's first novels were historical, à la Sir Walter Scott, though with an Irish setting. Like Scott, Le Fanu was sympathetic to the old Jacobite cause:
 The Cock and Anchor (1845), a story of old Dublin. It was reissued with slight alterations as Morley Court in 1873.
 The Fortunes of Colonel Torlogh O'Brien (1847)
 The House by the Churchyard (1863), the last of Le Fanu's novels to be set in the past and, as mentioned above, the last with an Irish setting. It is noteworthy that here Le Fanu's historical style is blended with his later Gothic style, influenced by his reading of the classic writers of that genre, such as Ann Radcliffe. This novel, later cited by James Joyce in Finnegans Wake, is set in Chapelizod, where Le Fanu lived in his youth.

Sensation novels
Le Fanu published many novels in the contemporary sensation fiction style of Wilkie Collins and others:
 Wylder's Hand (1864)
 Guy Deverell (1865)
 All in the Dark (1866), satirising spiritualism.
 The Tenants of Malory (1867) 
 A Lost Name (1868) an adaptation of The Evil Guest
 Haunted Lives (1868)
 The Wyvern Mystery (1869)
 Checkmate (1871)
 The Rose and the Key (1871), which describes the horrors of the private lunatic asylum, a classic gothic theme.
 Willing to Die (1872)

Major works
His best-known works, still widely read today, are:
 Uncle Silas (1864), a macabre mystery novel and classic of gothic horror. It is a much-extended adaptation of his earlier short story "Passage in the Secret History of an Irish Countess", with the setting changed from Ireland to England. A film version under the same name was made by Gainsborough Studios in 1947, and a remake entitled The Dark Angel, starring Peter O'Toole as the title character, was made in 1987.
 In a Glass Darkly (1872), a collection of five short stories in the horror and mystery genres, presented as the posthumous papers of the occult detective Dr Hesselius:
"Green Tea", a haunting narrative of a man plagued by a demonic monkey. 
"The Familiar", a slightly revised version of Le Fanu's 1847 tale "The Watcher". M. R. James considered this to be the best ghost story ever written.
"Mr Justice Harbottle", another panorama of Hell and much loved by M. R. James.
"The Room in the Dragon Volant", not a ghost story but a notable mystery story that includes the theme of premature burial
"Carmilla", a compelling tale of a female vampire, set in central Europe.  It has inspired several films, including Hammer's The Vampire Lovers (1970), Roger Vadim's Blood and Roses (1960), and Danish director Carl Theodor Dreyer's Vampyr (1932). Scholars like A. Asbjørn Jøn have also noted the important place that "Carmilla" holds in shifting the portrayal of vampires in modern fiction.

Other short-story collections

 Chronicles of Golden Friars (1871), a collection of three novellas set in the imaginary English village of Golden Friars:
 "A Strange Adventure in the Life of Miss Laura Mildmay", incorporating the story "Madam Crowl's Ghost".
 "The Haunted Baronet".
 "The Bird of Passage".
 The Watcher and Other Weird Stories (1894), another collection of short stories, published posthumously.
 Madam Crowl's Ghost and Other Tales of Mystery (1923), uncollected short stories gathered from their original magazine publications and edited by M. R. James:
"Madam Crowl's Ghost", from All the Year Round, December 1870.
"Squire Toby's Will", from Temple Bar, January 1868.
"Dickon the Devil", from London Society, Christmas Number, 1872.
"The Child That Went with the Fairies", from All the Year Round, February 1870.
"The White Cat of Drumgunniol", from All the Year Round, April 1870.
"An Account of Some Strange Disturbances in Aungier Street", from the Dublin University Magazine, January 1851.
"Ghost Stories of Chapelizod", from the Dublin University Magazine, January 1851.
"Wicked Captain Walshawe, of Wauling", from the Dublin University Magazine, April 1864.
"Sir Dominick's Bargain", from All the Year Round, July 1872.
"Ultor de Lacy", from the Dublin University Magazine, December 1861.
"The Vision of Tom Chuff", from All the Year Round, October 1870.
"Stories of Lough Guir", from All the Year Round, April 1870.

The publication of this book, which has often been reprinted, led to the revival in interest in Le Fanu, which has continued to this day.

Legacy and influence
In addition to M. R. James, several other writers have expressed strong admiration for Le Fanu's fiction. E. F. Benson stated that Le Fanu's stories "Green Tea", "The Familiar", and "Mr. Justice Harbottle" "are instinct with an awfulness which custom cannot stale, and this quality is due, as in The Turn of the Screw, to Le Fanu's admirably artistic methods in setting and narration". Benson added, "[Le Fanu's] best work is of the first rank, while as a 'flesh-creeper' he is unrivalled. No one else has so sure a touch in mixing the mysterious atmosphere in which horror darkly breeds". Jack Sullivan has asserted that Le Fanu is "one of the most important and innovative figures in the development of the ghost story" and that Le Fanu's work has had "an incredible influence on the genre; [he is] regarded by M. R. James, E. F. Bleiler, and others as the most skilful writer of supernatural fiction in English."

Le Fanu's work influenced several later writers. Most famously, Carmilla influenced Bram Stoker in the writing of Dracula. M. R. James' ghost fiction was influenced by Le Fanu's work in the genre. Oliver Onions's supernatural novel The Hand of Kornelius Voyt (1939) was inspired by Le Fanu's Uncle Silas.

See also
 List of horror fiction writers

References

Sources

Further reading
There is an extensive critical analysis of Le Fanu's supernatural stories (particularly "Green Tea", "Schalken the Painter", and Carmilla) in Jack Sullivan's book Elegant Nightmares: The English Ghost Story from Le Fanu to Blackwood (1978). Other books on Le Fanu include Wilkie Collins, Le Fanu and Others (1931) by S. M. Ellis, Sheridan Le Fanu (1951) by Nelson Browne, Joseph Sheridan Le Fanu (1971) by Michael H. Begnal, Sheridan Le Fanu (third edition, 1997) by W. J. McCormack, Le Fanu's Gothic: The Rhetoric of Darkness (2004) by Victor Sage and Vision and Vacancy: The Fictions of J. S. Le Fanu (2007) by James Walton.

Le Fanu, his works, and his family background are explored in Gavin Selerie's mixed prose/verse text Le Fanu's Ghost (2006). Gary William Crawford's J. Sheridan Le Fanu: A Bio-Bibliography (1995) is the first full bibliography. Crawford and Brian J. Showers's Joseph Sheridan Le Fanu: A Concise Bibliography (2011) is a supplement to Crawford's out-of-print 1995 bibliography. With Jim Rockhill and Brian J. Showers, Crawford has edited Reflections in a Glass Darkly: Essays on J. Sheridan Le Fanu. Jim Rockhill's introductions to the three volumes of the Ash-Tree Press edition of Le Fanu's short supernatural fiction (Schalken the Painter and Others [2002], The Haunted Baronet and Others [2003], Mr Justice Harbottle and Others [2005]) provide a perceptive account of Le Fanu's life and work.

Julian Moynahan's Anglo-Irish: The Literary Imagination in a Hyphenated Culture (Princeton University Press, 1995) includes a study of Le Fanu's mystery writing.

External links

 
 
 
 
 
 "Le Fanu, J Sheridan" in The Encyclopedia of Fantasy
 
 Le Fanu Studies – online journal
 Sheridan Le Fanu secondary bibliography (archived)
 A talk by M. R. James on LeFanu
 Article by Brian Showers on the location of the Le Fanu burial plot
 
  Archival material at 
 The White Cat Of Drumgunniol audiobook with video at YouTube
 The White Cat Of Drumgunniol audiobook at Libsyn

1814 births
1873 deaths
Le Fanu, Sheridan
Writers from Dublin (city)
Auditors of the College Historical Society
Irish people of French descent
Irish horror writers
Irish fantasy writers
Irish novelists
Irish male short story writers
19th-century Irish short story writers
Irish mystery writers
Alumni of Trinity College Dublin
Irish Anglicans
19th-century Irish novelists
Ghost story writers
Victorian novelists
Sheridan
Irish male novelists
Writers of Gothic fiction